Moon-Boy is a fictional character appearing in American comic books published by Marvel Comics. He is best known as the constant companion of Devil Dinosaur.

Publication history
Being primarily a supporting character to Devil Dinosaur, Moon-Boy has yet to be the lead character in a comic book series of his own. His appearances in print have been invariably linked to the appearances of Devil Dinosaur. Moon-Boy made his debut in Devil Dinosaur #1 (April 1978) and was a continuing character in all nine issues of the series' run. Since the cancellation of the original Devil Dinosaur series, Moon-Boy's appearances have coincided with Devil Dinosaur's various cameo appearances, supporting roles, and one-shot comics.

The team of Devil Dinosaur and Moon-Boy was created by artist Jack Kirby who scripted and penciled all issues of the first Devil Dinosaur series. Kirby's intent was for the duo to be inhabitants of Earth's prehistoric past as evidenced by a title on the cover of Devil Dinosaur #1 which proclaims Moon-Boy to be the "first human". Some later writers of the characters retconned the pair to be mutants from an alien world, while more recent writers have written them as being from Dinosaur World (Earth-78411), a planet located in a parallel universe contained within the Marvel Multiverse.

Fictional character biography
Moon-Boy was born into a tribe of intelligent, fur-covered, ape-like humanoids known as the "Small-Folk". The Small-Folk were hunter-gatherers that made their home in the "Valley of Flame", a region of numerous active volcanoes. Moon-Boy's connection with Devil Dinosaur began as a young boy when he came across a female dinosaur being attacked by a rival tribe known as the "Killer-Folk". The female was killed, as well as two of her three young. The third did not die however, but was transformed when the Killer-Folk attempted to burn him to death with their torches. The fire permanently scorched the young dinosaur's skin bright red. Moon-Boy cared for the orphaned creature after its ordeal and named him "Devil".

Ostracized from his tribe because of his association with Devil, Moon-Boy and his red companion became wanderers. Devil and Moon-Boy's wanderings eventually took them to distant times and worlds. First, they encountered extraterrestrials. Next they encountered Godzilla, who had been transported to Moonboy and Devil Dinosaur's alternate Earth. In time, they encountered the Fallen Angels. They traveled to Earth, and temporarily took up residence with the Fallen Angels in New York City. After several trips to the modern era of Earth-616 via magic, time travel, and teleportation by mutants, the pair eventually settled in the Savage Land of Earth-616.

While residing in the Savage Land, the forgotten world was invaded by the power hungry Roxxon Oil Company. Ka-Zar, ruler of the Savage Land, recruited Moon-Boy and Devil Dinosaur to help fight off the invasion, and Moon-Boy proved his worth as fighter during the following war. Later, Moon-Boy became separated from Devil when he was removed from the Savage Land and taken to New York City by the Heroes for Hire mercenary team who were hired by S.H.I.E.L.D. scientists to retrieve the "Homo habilis" so that they might study his DNA.

Moon-Boy would remain under the custody of S.H.I.E.L.D. for some time, which drove Devil into a sort of saurian depression causing him to refuse to hunt or even to eat food given to him. This came to the attention of Stegron, the dinosaur man, who feared for the life of the beast, and left the Savage Land secretly to wage war upon S.H.I.E.L.D. Using an army of reanimated dinosaurs, Stegron attacked base after base searching for Moon-Boy, and was only stopped by the Fifty State Initiative. However, once learning the motive behind Stegron's attacks, the Initiative recruit Reptil, smuggled Moon-Boy out of the country and returned him to the Savage Land, where he was reunited with his companion.

Moon-Boy and Devil Dinosaur frightened off a pair of Killer Folk to reclaim the Nightstone which the Killer Folk worshipped and had killed many Small Folk over. Devil Dinosaur chased away the Killer Folk while Moon-Boy took hold of the Nightstone with the intention of hiding it far away from the Killer Folk's grasp. A band of Killer Folk emerged from the trees and attacked Moon-Boy, beating him relentlessly with their fists to try to reclaim the Nightstone. At that moment the Nightstone disappeared due to a vortex opened by Lunella Lafayette (the future Moon Girl) and the Killer Folk went through in search of the Nightstone, leaving the brutalized Moon-Boy behind. Devil Dinosaur found his long-running companion as he died of his injuries. Moon-Boy expressed regret he would have to leave his friend and told him to hunt the Killer Folk through the vortex, stop them from getting the Nightstone and to avenge him. Moon-Boy succumbed to his wounds and died beneath a full moon as Devil Dinosaur went into the vortex to avenge him.

Some time later, Devil and Moon Girl make use of a time machine to save Moon-Boy moments before his death.

Powers and abilities
Moon-Boy has lifelong experience at foraging and general survival in the wild. He is somehow able to understand the guttural noises of his companion Devil Dinosaur as language. Moon-Boy has little experience with civilized culture and/or behavior. He is extremely hairy, with thick fur covering all but his palms, soles, and face. Moon-Boy often goes about unclothed; his thick pelt of animal-like hair provides sufficient protection from the elements.

Alternative versions
 In the alternate universe, Earth-9997, of the Earth X series, Moon-Boy's skeleton is seen on the Blue Area of the Moon atop the skeleton of Devil Dinosaur. Wolverine is revealed to be a descendant of Moon-Boy.
 In the Mutant X series alternate universe, "Moon Knight Boy" is a member of Earth-1298's version of the Lethal Legion.
 In the Nextwave series, which in 2006 was declared by Marvel Editor-in-Chief Joe Quesada to be set in a universe separate from the main Marvel continuity, Devil Dinosaur is revealed to be the head of two organizations with ties to terrorism, the Beyond Corporation© and S.I.L.E.N.T., both of which he created due to his growing hatred of "monkeys". Devil is depicted as having the power of speech and proclaims: "Moon-Boy hated me. Moon-Boy had to die. Moon-Boy tasted bad and gave me considerable rectal distress".

In other media

Television
 Moon-Boy appears in The Super Hero Squad Show episode "The Devil Dinosaur You Say! (Six Against Infinity, Part 4)", voiced by Josh Keaton. This version is from an alternate universe called "Dinosaur World".
 Moon-Boy appears in the Hulk and the Agents of S.M.A.S.H. episode "Days of Future Smash: The Dino Era", voiced by James Arnold Taylor. This version is from an alternate timeline created by the Leader where dinosaurs evolved to become intelligent and civilized.

Video game
Moon-Boy appears as a playable character in Lego Marvel's Avengers, voiced again by James Arnold Taylor.

References

Characters created by Jack Kirby
Comics characters introduced in 1978
Fictional prehistoric characters
Gorilla characters in comics
Marvel Comics male superheroes